The 2007 FIBA Asia Championship for Women was the qualifying tournament for FIBA Asia at the women's basketball tournament at the 2008 Summer Olympics at Beijing. The tournament was held on Incheon, South Korea from June 3 to June 10.

The championship was divided into two levels: Level I and Level II. The two lowest finishers of Level I met the top two finishers of Level II to determine which teams qualified for Level I at the 2009 championship. The losers were relegated to (or remained in) Level II.

Participating teams

Preliminary round

Level I

Level II

Qualifying round 
Winners are promoted to Level I for the 2009 championships.

Final round

Semifinals

3rd place

Final

Final standing

Awards

External links
FIBA Asia Championship 2007 official website 
FIBA Asia official website

2007
2007 in women's basketball
women
International women's basketball competitions hosted by South Korea
B
2007 in South Korean women's sport